Mehjoor Ali Sofi (born 15 April 1991 in Srinagar, Kashmir) is an Indian cricketer who plays as medium pacer. He has the speed and swing to rattle the best in the business. He played 1 first-class 4 List A and 5 Twenty20 matches for Jammu and Kashmir cricket team from 2014.

Mehjoor has also played for various clubs across India which includes CC&FC, Rajasthan Club Kolkata, Air India and Bangkok International Sixes Tournament for CC&FC in 2013.

His Strength is raw pace, can move ball both ways, high-arm action, hits the deck hard, and able to make the ball bounce from awkward lengths.

Early years 
After Passing his school exam of class 10th Mehjoor joined M.P. Higher Secondary School Srinagar for higher studies. In the same joined Imtiaz Ahmed Cricket Academy in Bengaluru for three months joiner level coaching camp after which Imtiaz Ahmed praised his bowling and wished him to stay for his bright future but Mehjoor returned home and wished to play for his own state. Mehjoor has complete his graduation in Bachelor of Arts from Gandhi Memorial College, Srinagar.

References

External links
 
 

1991 births
Living people
Indian cricketers
Jammu and Kashmir cricketers
People from Srinagar